David or Dave Berry may refer to:

 David Berry (landowner) (1795–1889), Scottish-born livestock breeder and landowner in colonial Australia
 Dave Berry (American football) (born c.1865), American football manager
 Dave Berry (musician) (born 1941), British musician
 David Berry (writer) (1943–2016), American playwright
 Dave Berry (footballer) (born 1945), English footballer
 David Berry (politician) (born 1951), Australian politician
 David Berry (inventor) (born 1978), American inventor, entrepreneur, and venture capitalist
 Dave Berry (presenter) (born 1978), British television presenter and radio DJ
 David Berry (educator) (born 1960), English lecturer and writer
 David Berry (special effects artist), special effects artist in the 1970s and 1980s
 David Berry (actor), Australian actor
 Dave Berry (Canadian football) (c. 1922–2007), Canadian football player
 David A. Berry, American educator and administrator
 Dave Berry, mixed martial artist who fought in UFC 11

See also
 David de Berry (1952–1995), American theater composer and actor
 David Berry Hart (1851–1920), Scottish doctor
 David Berry Knapp (born 1948), American businessman, member of the Rajneesh movement
 David Berri (born 1969), American sports economist
 David Barry (disambiguation)